Sulthan is a 2021 Indian Tamil-language action film written and directed by Bakkiyaraj Kannan, produced by S. R. Prakash Babu and S. R. Prabhu under the banner Dream Warrior Pictures. The film stars Karthi, Rashmika Mandanna, and  Ramachandra Raju, both marking the latter's debut in Tamil cinema. Napoleon, Lal, Yogi Babu, and Nawab Shah play supporting roles. The film features the score by Yuvan Shankar Raja with songs composed by Vivek–Mervin. The cinematography and editing were handled by Sathyan Sooryan and Ruben respectively.

The film was released on 2 April 2021. The film received mixed reviews from critics and audience, and became an average hit at the box office because of theatre close due to COVID-19 pandemic.

Plot
  
1986: Sethupathi is a gangster in Madras who has a gang of 100 goons, working as vigilantes. One day, Sethupathi's enemies barge into their house to kill Sethupathi. The baby kicks the stomach causing his wife Annalakshmi to go into labour. The gang beat the intruders while Sethupathi is with Annalakshmi. 

Annalakshmi gives birth to a boy, but dies. Sethupathi gives the boy to his gang member Mansoor, who names him Vikram aka Sulthan. The gang raises Sulthan with love and care, and Sulthan sees them as his brothers. Sulthan grows up and goes abroad to pursue Robotics Engineering.

2021: A village head meets Sethupathi with a request to kill a person named Jayaseelan. The head narrates about the village practices in agriculture. When Jayaseelan asks for their land, they refuse which enrages him, and he kills many farmers and burns their lands. Upon hearing this, Sethupathi promises to kill Jayaseelan. 

When asked by Mansoor, Sethupathi tells that they have done many crimes in their life and they can do something good with the case of the head. At the same time, Sulthan arrives at the village in great splendour. One day, the gang is attacked by a few people who pose as pizza delivery men. They injure Sethupathi and a member of the gang, who is critical and admitted to the hospital. 

The goon's mother is distraught, leaving Sulthan mentally tarnished. Sulthan angrily confronts Sethupathi and tells him that he is going to leave and never going to come back. Due to this, Sethupathi dies in his sleep. At Sethupathi's funeral, Sulthan finds out that the attackers that night are police officers sent by Commissioner Manickavel with the intent to kill Sethupathi. Sulthan meets him and asks for an opportunity to reform the gang. 

Manickavel gives Sulthan 6 months to reform them, but tells him that not a single case should be filed on them in that time. Mansoor gets a phone call from the village head reminding him of the promise made to them. Mansoor sends twenty of the men including Otta Lorry to kill Jayaseelan, but Sulthan forbids them. They try to sneak out to the village but Sulthan catches them. Otta Lorry comes up with a lie that he has a marriage proposal in the village. 

Sulthan decides to take the entire gang with him to the village, so they will be out of trouble. The entire village goes along with the lie with a promise made by Mansoor saying that they will kill Jayaseelan. The head's daughter Rukmani acts as the bride. Otta Lorry rejects her as an act, but Sulthan genuinely falls for her. He confesses his love for her to the family and asks for her hand in marriage but she rejects him. 

Sulthan tries to woo her but to no avail. The gang wants to leave, but Sulthan tells them that until Rukmani falls in love with her they will not leave. The gang secretly follows Jayaseelan planning to kill him, but their attempts are unsuccessful. The village finds out that Jayaseelan is not after their lands but rather for the iron in a mountain. The only way to stop Jayaseelan is to prove their lands are fertile and that crops can grow on the land, but they only have 6 months. 

Sulthan is reprimanded by Rukmani while Mansoor and the gang attempt to kill Jayaseelan at the market, but Sulthan who is in the market stops the attack and yells at the gang. As they prepare to leave, a villager informs the gang that Jayaseelan has taken over the city. Jayaseelan brutally beats all the villagers including Rukmani. An angered Sulthan severely beats up Jayaseelan and his men. 

Meanwhile, the police force starts a sting operation to kill all the goons in the city in unofficial encounters to attain peace. Sulthan learns about the news and extends their stay in the village for 5 more months and in their stay, they will practice agriculture. They work day and night in the fields. A corporate businessman arrives at the village and asks Sulthan if he can buy the mountain, but Sulthan refuses. 

Enraged, the businessman sends goons at night to kill Sulthan but Sulthan beats all of them. The next day, Michael, one of the members of the gang, attempts to drown someone. Sulthan stops him and tells him to leave the group but later finds out that the man Michael was beating was assaulting a woman. Sulthan apologizes to Michael but he turns bitter towards Sulthan.

The gang's hard work is rewarded when their plants start to grow on their land. The businessman grows enraged after hearing the news, but Amith Raj, who is a part of the Ministry of Mines postpones the inspection so that the businessman can prove that the lands are barren. Rukmani reciprocates Sulthan's feelings and accepts the marriage proposal. Sulthan and Rukmani get engaged in front of the villagers and the gang in a grand celebration. 

Sulthan buys 2 acres of land for the whole gang by selling his house and spending his entire saving. That night on the bus, Mansoor gets fatally stabbed by a few people sent by the businessman, but Sulthan beats all of them. Mansoor dies due to his injuries. The gang gets ready to go and kill the businessman but Sulthan stops them. Michael challenges Sulthan to a fight and whoever loses should follow what the winner tells them to do. Sulthan manages to overpower Michael but this leads to the gang loathing him. The gang leaves Sulthan and leaves the village, leaving Sulthan devastated. 

The businessman learns that the gang has left Sulthan so he plans to burn the village. Jayaseelan calls Sulthan and tells him that he brought many people to kill Sulthan and the villagers, and they will be coming back. Sulthan decides to protect the village from Jayaseelan and the businessman. Sulthan evacuates all the villagers from the village, but he stays back to protect the village. The businessman and his men arrive at night and burn the crops but Sulthan, his guard Gada and a few farmers arrive and kill many of the businessman's henchmen, but Sulthan gets injured. 

Sulthan beats up and kills the businessman and his men. Just then, Jayaseelan and his men arrive with a kidnapped Rukmani, but the gang arrives, when they learn about Sulthan's sacrifices to protect them, and Michael apologises to Sulthan. They reconcile with Sulthan and they kill Jayaseelan and his men. The gang begins to work again in agriculture willingly while Sulthan and Rukmani watch on.

Cast

Production

Development 
In October 2017, sources claimed that Karthi was reported to star in new film helmed by Bakkiyaraj Kannan, a former associate of Atlee, who directed the Sivakarthikeyan-starrer Remo (2016), and produced by K. E. Gnanavelraja of Studio Green. In January 2019, it was reported that S. R. Prabhu, one of the producers from Dream Warrior Pictures, had confirmed the project officially. It was reported that the film will go on floors, only after the actor's completion with Lokesh Kanagaraj's Kaithi (2019). On the very same month, it was reported that Rashmika Mandanna or Raashi Khanna will play the female lead; with Rashmika being signed in for the project in February 2019, making her debut in Tamil cinema.

In May 2019, sources reported that the film will be titled as Sulthan, although an official confirmation was not revealed from the producers. However, in August 2019, actress Rashmika accidentally revealed the title of the film without the consent of the filmmakers, which made the team upset. Rashmika later apologised to the makers and the rest of the team. The title Sulthan was previously associated with the shelved animated film, Sultan: The Warrior, which was to star Rajinikanth.

Filming 
The project was officially launched on 13 March 2019, at the office of Dream Warrior Pictures, with the attendance of the film's cast and crew. After a brief shoot of the film being completed, a source claimed that the makers planned to shoot the film within a single schedule, with sets being erected in Chennai. The team successfully completed the first schedule in June 2019, and the makers planned for a second schedule of the film on 28 June 2019, with Karthi joining the sets on 10 July, post the completion of Jeethu Joseph's Thambi (2019). However, Rashmika revealed that the film's shoot is postponed to August, due to unknown reasons, although Karthi resumed the shooting of the film on 7 August 2019.

While the film's shooting undergone a brisk pace, the team was subjected to Hindutva outfits who disrupted the film's shoot at Malaikkottai in Dindigul on 24 September 2019. The protesters belonging to the Bharatiya Janata Party (BJP), Hindu Munnani and the Hindu Makkal Katchi raised objections to the film's title Sulthan, who assumed to be based on the biopic of the 18th century ruler Tipu Sultan, and said that he had attacked Tamils during his rule. Later producer S. R. Prabhu revealed that the film is not based on a biopic, but a rural drama film. Due to the COVID-19 pandemic in India, the film's last leg shoot along with post-production works came to a halt.

With the state government imposed guidelines, to resume the film shooting, the makers started the final leg of the shoot on 25 September 2020 at Chennai, instead of Dindigul. The film's shooting was completed on 8 October 2020.

Music

The film score is composed by Yuvan Shankar Raja while the songs are composed by Vivek-Mervin. The lyrics were written by Viveka and Thanikodi. The first single track from the film titled "Jai Sulthan" was released on 11 February 2021, which was sung by Anirudh, Junior Nithya and Gaana Guna. The second single titled "Yaaraiyum Ivalo Azhaga" was sung by Silambarasan, with lyrics written by Viveka which released on 5 March 2021. The third single "Eppadi Iruntha Naanga", sung by Anthony Daasan, Mahalingam and Vivek Siva was released on 15 March 2021.

Initially Vivek and Mervin were reported to handle the film's background score. However, Bakkiyaraj opted Yuvan Shankar Raja to score music for the background and also credited in the film's trailer. It was noted that Vivek and Mervin had worked in the score for the film's teaser.

Release

Theatrical
Sulthan was initially slated to release in 22 May 2020, but was delayed indefinitely due to the COVID-19 pandemic. The film was later scheduled to release on the occasion of Pongal (14 January 2021), clashing with Vijay's Master (2021). However, the makers did not confirm the release through the said date. In February 2021, the release date of the film was announced as 2 April 2021.

In March 2021, the producer S. R. Prabhu claimed that the film will release on the said date, despite being rumoured that the film may postpone due to the Tamil Nadu Legislative Assembly elections as well as the rise in COVID-19 cases across Tamil Nadu.

Marketing
A pre-release event for the film was held on 24 March 2021 at Sathyam Cinemas in Chennai.

Home media
The film was released in Disney+ Hotstar on 2 May 2021 and The film was premiered in Star Vijay on 10 October 2021.

Reception

Critical Response 
Manoj Kumar R of The Indian Express rated the film 4 stars of 5 and praised high production values and emotional content. "Director Bakkiyaraj Kannan’s solidity expands on the belief that men are naturally good," he wrote. Sirinivasa Ramanujam in his review for The Hindu called the it "engaging commercial film that combines two popular Tamil cinema's ideas: rowdyism and farming."

Firstpost critic Ranjani Krishnakumar opined that the film "suffers from confused messaging with a dash of masala."  Haricharan Pudipeddi of Hindustan Times compared Sulthan with other films with similar plotlines such as Ram Gopal Varma's Sarkar, Mahesh Babu's Maharshi and Kamal Haasan's Thevar Magan. Pudipeddi stated that "In spite of borrowing from quite a few films, Sulthan still manages to engage and entertain, making it a highly predictable but fun action drama." Baradwaj Rangan of Film Companion South wrote "The writer-director doesn't trust his premise. He wants to keep throwing in more, more, more."

Box office 
The film had a better opening on the first day of its release, collecting around Rs 5 crores. The film grossed over Rs 12 crores during the first two days of its worldwide release.

References

External links 

2021 action drama films
2021 films
Films scored by Yuvan Shankar Raja
Indian action drama films
2020s masala films
2020s Tamil-language films